The Nyanga River, 600 km, is a river that runs through southern Gabon and northern Republic of the Congo. It is the second most important river in Gabon after the Ogooue. It is well known for the numerous rapids that break up its otherwise smooth course.

Course 

It rises on the border between the two countries, near the juncture of N'Gounié and Ogooué-Lolo provinces of Gabon, runs south along the border and then southwest through the Niari province of Congo, then enters the Nyanga province of Gabon and makes a sharp bend to the northwest. It passes through Nyanga's capital Tchibanga (the largest city on the river), then gradually bends around to the southwest again, running through a series of rapids before coming out onto a coastal plain and emptying into the Atlantic Ocean.

Tributaries 

 Moukalaba, which receives water of its own tributary, the Ganzi River
 Douli

References 

 National Geographic. 2003. African Adventure Atlas Pg 24,72. led by Sean Fraser.
 Lerique Jacques. 1983. Hydrographie-Hydrologie. in Geographie et Cartographie du Gabon, Atlas Illustré led by The Ministère de l'Education Nationale de la Republique Gabonaise. Pg 14–15. Paris, France: Edicef.

Rivers of Gabon
Rivers of the Republic of the Congo
International rivers of Africa
Republic of the Congo–Gabon border
Border rivers